The Estadio Melgar  is a multi-use stadium in Arequipa, Peru. Its primary use is to host football games for Peruvian First Division team FBC Melgar and Peruvian Segunda Division team Sportivo Huracán and Copa Perú teams  Senati FBC, FBC Aurora and FBC White Star. The stadium has a seating capacity of 15,000 and includes a running track for track and field events. It was named after Mariano Melgar, a Peruvian patriot and poet from Arequipa. It is also known as "Estadio de Cuarto Centenario" (Fourth Centennial Stadium) since it is in a neighborhood which was built in celebration of the fourth centennial of the Spanish foundation of Arequipa. The stadium was a venue for the 2001 South American Under 17 Football Championship in Peru.

References

FBC Melgar
Melgar
Buildings and structures in Arequipa